Becoming Us is an American reality television series about a family with a transgender parent. It aired from June 8, 2015, to August 10, 2015, on ABC Family. The series centered on the Lehwald family of Evanston, Illinois, whose father has recently come out as a trans woman. The show also followed Ben's girlfriend Danielle's family because her dad is also transgender. Ryan Seacrest, Eugene Young, Rabih Gholam, Jennifer J. Duncan, and George Moll produced the show for Ryan Seacrest Productions, as well as Paul Barosse.

Episodes

See also 
 I Am Cait (2015)
 I Am Jazz (2015)
 Transparent (2014)
 Media portrayals of transgender people

References

External links 
 
 

2010s American LGBT-related television series
2010s American reality television series
2010s LGBT-related reality television series
2015 American television series debuts
2015 American television series endings
ABC Family original programming
American LGBT-related reality television series
English-language television shows
Television series by Disney–ABC Domestic Television
Television shows set in Illinois
Transgender-related television shows